Bughea may refer to several places in Romania:

 Bughea de Jos, a commune in Argeș County
 Bughea de Jos, a village in the commune Gura Vitioarei in Prahova County
 Bughea de Sus, a commune in Argeș County
 Bughea de Sus, a village in the commune Teișani in Prahova County
 Bughea (Râul Târgului), a tributary of the Râul Târgului in Argeș County
 Bughea (Teleajen), a tributary of the Teleajen in Prahova County